Min-jung, also spelled Min-jeong, is a Korean feminine given name. The meaning differs based on the hanja used to write each syllable of the name. There are 27 hanja with the reading "min" and 75 hanja with the reading "jung" on the South Korean government's official list of hanja which may be used in given names.

People with this name include:

Entertainers
Seo Min-jung (born 1979), South Korean actress
Lee Min-jung (born 1982), South Korean actress
Kim Min-jung (actress) (born 1982), South Korean actress
Han Yeo-reum (born 1983), stage name Seo Min-jeong, South Korean actress
Yeo Min-jeong (voice actress) (born 1986), South Korean voice actress

Sportspeople
Ku Min-jung (born 1973), South Korean volleyball player
Kim Min-jung (speed skater) (born 1985), South Korean speed skater
Kim Min-jung (badminton) (born 1986), South Korean badminton player
Kwak Min-jeong (born 1994), South Korean figure skater
Kim Min-jung (judoka) (born 1997), South Korean judoka
Kim Min-jung (sport shooter) (born 1997), South Korean sport shooter
Choi Min-jeong (born 1998), South Korean short track speed skater

Other
Michael Yang (born Yang Min-jeong, 1962), South Korean-born American entrepreneur
Mina Cheon (born Cheon Min-jeong, 1973), South Korean-born American new media artist
Kim Min-jeong (poet) (born 1976), South Korean poet

See also
List of Korean given names

References

Korean feminine given names